Neh'mind is the second EP by rapper Krizz Kaliko. It was released on November 27, 2012.

Guest artists
Guests include Snow Tha Product, Oobergeek, and Tech N9ne. The production was handled by JMac Tracks, Seven and Young Fyre.

Commercial performance 
The album debuted at number 161 on the US Billboard 200 chart, with first-week sales of 3,800 copies in the United States.

Track listing

References

2012 EPs
Hip hop EPs
Krizz Kaliko albums
Albums produced by Seven (record producer)
Strange Music EPs